

Season summary 
In attempt to reborn, Torino bet on Brazilian playmaker Leo Junior. On 18 November, a goal by Aldo Serena - who scored during injury time - brought the win in citizen derby. A week later, "Toro" was knocked out by Hellas Verona that, due to this win, couldn't  top the league.

Whilst Hellas would eventually win title, Radice's side managed to get a second place useful to participate in UEFA Cup for 1985–86 season.

Squad

Goalkeepers
  Silvano Martina
  Renato Copparoni

Defenders
  Paolo Beruatto
  Giancarlo Corradini
  Luigi Danova
  Giovanni Francini
  Roberto Galbiati

Midfielders
  Domenico Caso
  Antonio Comi
  Giuseppe Dossena
  Giacomo Ferri
  Júnior
  Marco Osio
  Silvio Picci
  Danilo Pileggi
  Claudio Sclosa
  Renato Zaccarelli

Attackers
  Pietro Mariani
  Walter Schachner
  Aldo Serena

Competitions

Serie A

League table

Matches

Topscorers
  Aldo Serena 9
  Júnior 7
  Walter Schachner 7
  Giovanni Francini 2

Coppa Italia 

First round

Eightfinals

Quarterfinals

References

Sources
RSSSF - Italy 1984/85

Torino F.C. seasons
Torino